Raymond Friend (11 April 1898 – 1991) was an Australian cricketer. He played two first-class matches for Tasmania between 1927 and 1929.

See also
 List of Tasmanian representative cricketers

References

External links
 

1898 births
1991 deaths
Australian cricketers
Tasmania cricketers
Cricketers from Melbourne